Foot's Bay Water Aerodrome  is located  east of Foot's Bay in a bay of the same name in Lake Joseph, Ontario, Canada.

References

Registered aerodromes in Ontario
Transport in the District Municipality of Muskoka
Seaplane bases in Ontario